The following is an alphabetical list of topics related to the Marshall Islands.

0–9

.mh – Internet country code top-level domain for the Marshall Islands

A
Ailinginae Atoll
Ailinglaplap Atoll
Ailuk Atoll
Airports in the Marshall Islands
Arno Atoll
Atlas of the Marshall Islands
Attongtonganebwokwbwokw
Aur Atoll

B
Bikar Atoll
Bikini Atoll
Birds of the Marshall Islands
Bokak Atoll
Bucholz Army Airfield

C
Capital of the Marshall Islands:  Majuro
Categories:
:Category:Marshall Islands
:Category:Buildings and structures in the Marshall Islands
:Category:Communications in the Marshall Islands
:Category:Economy of the Marshall Islands
:Category:Education in the Marshall Islands
:Category:Environment of the Marshall Islands
:Category:Geography of the Marshall Islands
:Category:Government of the Marshall Islands
:Category:History of the Marshall Islands
:Category:Marshall Islands-related lists
:Category:Marshallese culture
:Category:Marshallese people
:Category:Politics of the Marshall Islands
:Category:Society of the Marshall Islands
:Category:Sports in the Marshall Islands
:Category:Transportation in the Marshall Islands
commons:Category:Marshall Islands
Cities in the Marshall Islands
Climate of the Marshall Islands
Coat of arms of the Marshall Islands
Communications in the Marshall Islands
Compact of Free Association with the United States of America
Culture of the Marshall Islands

D
Demographics of the Marshall Islands
Diplomatic missions in the Marshall Islands
Diplomatic missions of the Marshall Islands

E
Eastern Hemisphere
Ebon Atoll
Economy of the Marshall Islands
Education in the Marshall Islands
Elections in the Marshall Islands
Enewetak Atoll
English language
Erikub Atoll

F

Flag of the Marshall Islands
Foreign relations of the Marshall Islands

G
Geography of the Marshall Islands
Government of the Marshall Islands
Gross domestic product
 Gugeegue

H
Health care in the Marshall Islands
History of the Marshall Islands

I
International Organization for Standardization (ISO)
ISO 3166-1 alpha-2 country code for Marshall Islands: MH
ISO 3166-1 alpha-3 country code for Marshall Islands: MHL
ISO 3166-2:MH region codes for Marshall Islands
Internet in the Marshall Islands
Island countries
Islands of the Republic of the Marshall Islands:

Ailinginae Atoll
Ailinglaplap Atoll
Ailuk Atoll
Arno Atoll
Aur Atoll
Bikar Atoll
Bikini Atoll
Bokak Atoll
Ebon Atoll
Enen-kio Atoll
Enewetak Atoll
Erikub Atoll
Jabat Island
Jaluit Atoll
Jemo Island
Kili Island
Knox Atoll
Kwajalein
Lae Atoll
Lib Island
Likiep Atoll
Majuro Atoll
Maloelap Atoll
Mejit Island
Mili Atoll
Namdrik Atoll
Namu Atoll
Rongelap Atoll
Rongerik Atoll
Toke Atoll
Ujae Atoll
Ujelang Atoll
Utirik Atoll
Wotho Atoll
Wotje Atoll

J
Jabat Island
Jaluit Atoll
Jemo Island

K
Kili Island
Knox Atoll
Kwajalein

L
Lae Atoll
Law enforcement in the Marshall Islands
Legislature of the Marshall Islands
Lib Island
Likiep Atoll
Lists:
Diplomatic missions of the Marshall Islands
List of islands of the Marshall Islands
List of airports in the Marshall Islands
List of archipelagos
List of birds of the Marshall Islands
List of cities in the Marshall Islands
List of countries by GDP (nominal)
List of diplomatic missions in the Marshall Islands
List of island countries
List of island countries by area
List of island countries by population density
List of Marshall Islands-related topics
List of political parties in the Marshall Islands

M
Majuro, capital
Majuro Atoll
Maloelap Atoll
Marshall Islands
Marshall Islands International Airport
Marshallese language
MH – ISO 3166-1 alpha-2 and USPS country code for the Republic of the Marshall Islands
MHL – ISO 3166-1 alpha-3 country code for the Republic of the Marshall Islands
Mejit Island
Micronesia
Micronesia challenge
Mili Atoll
Military of the Marshall Islands
Music of the Marshall Islands

N
Namdrik Atoll
Namu Atoll
Nitijela, national legislature
North Pacific Ocean
Northern Hemisphere

O
Oceania
Outline of the Marshall Islands

P
Pacific Ocean
Political parties in the Marshall Islands
Politics of the Marshall Islands
President of the Marshall Islands

R
Rälik Chain
Ratak Chain
Religion in the Marshall Islands
Republic of the Marshall Islands
Rongelap Atoll
Rongerik Atoll

S
Scouting in the Marshall Islands
Small Island Developing States

T
Toke Atoll
Topic outline of the Marshall Islands
Transportation in the Marshall Islands
Tropical cyclones in the Marshall Islands

U
Ujae Atoll
Ujelang Atoll
Utirik Atoll

W
Wake Island

Wikipedia:WikiProject Topic outline/Drafts/Topic outline of the Marshall Islands
Wōdejebato
Wotho Atoll
Wotje Atoll

See also

List of international rankings
Lists of country-related topics
Topic outline of geography
Topic outline of the Marshall Islands

External links

 
Marshall Islands